The Protestant cemetery in Augsburg on Haunstetter road in Hochfeld district of Augsburg was established in 1534 by the City of Augsburg. The cemetery is still in operation and used for burials. It is currently the oldest cemetery in Augsburg.

History and description
The Protestant Cemetery was established in 1534 by the City of Augsburg. Since the Peace of Westphalia in 1648 which ended the Thirty Years' War, the cemetery is owned by the Protestant parishes of the city of Augsburg; St. Anna, St. James, St. Ulrich and Holy Cross churches. In 1700, the administration building was built. The cemetery chapel was built in 1825 by Johann Michael Voit. In addition to the chapel, the morgue building was built in 1837.
In the cemetery, there are numerous grave monuments dating back to 17th century with elaborate tombs of classicism and the Gothic Revival architecture.
A special feature of the cemetery is its collection of old grave books with burial registers dating back to 1658, which have survived until today.

Notables burials
Notables buried include:
 Elias Holl (1573–1646), architect of early German Baroque architecture
 Anna Barbara von Stetten (1754–1805),  philanthropist
 Karl Albert Gollwitzer (1839–1917), architect

Gallery

Source and references

External links
  
 Pictures of Augsburg Protestant Cemetery
 

Cemeteries in Germany
Protestant Reformed cemeteries
Augsburg
1534 establishments in the Holy Roman Empire
Lutheran cemeteries in Germany